Rahat Faiq Jamali (born 10 March 1965) is a Pakistani politician who was a Member of the Provincial Assembly of Balochistan, from June 2013 to May 2018.

Early life and education
Jamali was born on 10 March 1965 in Usta Mohammad, Balochistan, Pakistan.

She has done Master of Arts	 in Urdu from the University of Balochistan.

She is sister of Jan Mohammad Jamali.

Political career

She was elected to the Provincial Assembly of Balochistan as a candidate of Pakistan Muslim League (N) from constituency PB-26 Jaffarabad-II in 2013 Pakistani general election. She had secured 12,521 votes.

In September 2017, she was appointed as Provincial Minister of Balochistan for Labour in the cabinet of Chief Minister Nawab Sanaullah Khan Zehri, where she remained until resigning in January 2018.

References

Living people
Pakistan Muslim League (N) politicians
1965 births
Balochistan MPAs 2013–2018
Women provincial ministers of Balochistan
21st-century Pakistani women politicians